The 1917 Rice Owls football team was an American football team that represented Rice University as a member of the Southwest Conference (SWC) during the 1917 college football season. In its sixth season under head coach Philip Arbuckle, the team compiled a 7–1 record (1–1 against SWC opponents), and outscored opponents by a total of 228 to 55.

Schedule

References

Rice
Rice Owls football seasons
Rice Owls football